Montserrat Lombard (born 1 August 1982) is an English actress best known for playing WPC (later DC) Sharon 'Shaz' Granger in the BBC drama series Ashes to Ashes.

Early life
Lombard was born in London and is of Spanish and Italian descent. She starred in The Late Show, alongside James Corden in 1997, before moving onto televisionwork and filmography.

Career
Her TV credits include regular roles in Love Soup (2005–2008) and Roman's Empire (2007) but she is most famous for her role as WPC Shaz Granger in the hit BBC drama Ashes to Ashes (2008–2010).

Other credits include guest roles in Doctors, Twisted Tales, Nathan Barley, Murder in Suburbia ("Witches", as a school girl named Myra who, among other things, bakes brownies and attempts to seduce her music teacher dressed in lacy underwear), a lead role in St Trinian's 2: The Legend of Fritton's Gold, Midsomer Murders: A Picture of Innocence, and a part in the feature-length ITV drama Tunnel Of Love. Lombard has also played Lavya in the episodes "Hello Queppu" and "Artefact" of the BBC Two sci-fi comedy series Hyperdrive, and Stevie in the fourth episode of the BBC Two comedy Saxondale. She appeared as Lady Anne in the BBC Radio 4 comedy The Castle, and has appeared in several stage productions, including People Who Don't Do Dinner Parties. 

Lombard played June in the short film Vanilla Song, created by National Film and Television School students, as well as Ian Sciacaluga's short film noir, Imbroglio. She played The Muse in William Mager's 2008 short film, Stiletto, funded by Apex Arts and the Hitchcock Production Fund. She had a small role in Terry Gilliam's The Imaginarium of Doctor Parnassus. In 2009, she worked on the film St Trinian's II: The Legend of Fritton's Gold, playing Zoe, the Emo.

She played Maria in the premiere episode of the 2011 TV series, The Borgias. She voiced the role of Mirania in the 2011–12 game The Last Story for Nintendo Wii.

She appeared in ITV's Marple: A Caribbean Mystery in 2013 as Esther Walters.  From September 2013 to January 2014 she starred alongside Lee Evans and Sheila Hancock in Barking in Essex at the Wyndhams Theatre.

In May 2016 she appeared on BBC Two in Ben Elton's comedy Upstart Crow as Shakespeare's dark lady muse Emelia (series 1 episode 4, and in October 2018 reprised the role in series 3 episode 6). In March 2017 she appeared in Private View, the series 3 finale of Inside No. 9 on BBC Two as a sarcastic waitress, Bea. Also in 2016 she appeared as different characters in Neil Gaiman's Likely Stories, a series of short films for Sky Arts directed by Iain Forsyth and Jane Pollard and scored by Jarvis Cocker. In 2019, she voices Mia on Thomas and Friends in US/UK versions.

Filmography

Film

Television

References

External links

Profile at United Agents

1982 births
Living people
English people of Italian descent
English people of Spanish descent
English film actresses
English radio actresses
English stage actresses
English television actresses
English voice actresses
Actresses from London
20th-century English actresses
21st-century English actresses